Patrikeyevo may refer to several rural localities in Russia:

Patrikeyevo, Kovrovsky District, Vladimir Oblast, village in Novoselskoye Rural Settlement, Kovrovsky District, Vladimir Oblast
Patrikeyevo, Sudogodsky District, Vladimir Oblast, village in Golovinskoye Rural Settlement, Sudogodsky District, Vladimir Oblast